This is a list of Greek football transfers in the summer transfer window 2011 by club.

Superleague

AEK Athens F.C.

In:

Out:

Aris Thessaloniki FC

In:

Out:

Asteras Tripoli F.C.

In:

Out:

Atromitos F.C.

In:

Out:

Doxa Dramas

In:

Out:

Iraklis Thessaloniki F.C.
(relegated due to failing to obtain a license to participate in 2011–12 Superleague)

In:

Out:

 canceled

Kavala F.C.
(excluded from the League being involved in Koriopolis)

In:

Out:

Kerkyra F.C.

In:

Out:

Levadiakos F.C.

In:

Out:

Olympiacos F.C.

In:

Out:

Olympiakos Volou F.C.
(excluded from the League being involved in Koriopolis)

In:

Out:

Panathinaikos F.C.

In:

Out:

Panetolikos F.C.

In:

Out:

Panionios G.S.S.

In:

Out:

P.A.O.K. F.C.

In:

Out:

PAS Giannina F.C.

In:

Out:

Skoda Xanthi F.C.

In:

Out:

References

External links
 Contra.gr
 Sport24.gr
 Balleto.gr

Greek
2011–12 in Greek football
2011